Irena Jurgielewiczowa (née Drozdowicz; 13 January 1903 – 25 May 2003) was a Polish teacher and writer of children's literature and young adult literature. During World War II she was an underground teacher, member of Armia Krajowa, and participant of the Warsaw Uprising. After the war she was a lecturer at the University of Warsaw.

She is best known for Ten obcy (That Stranger, 1961) and Inna.

Biography
Irena Jurgielewiczowa was born on 13 January 1903 in Działoszyn, Poland. She studied Polish philology at the Warsaw University, obtaining a doctoral degree in 1928, and pedagogy at the Wolna Wszechnica Polska (Free Polish University). She worked as a teacher in Warsaw beginning in 1928. She spend 1932 through 1934 in France. After her return she was a lecturer at Wolna Wszechnica Polska. During World War II in occupied Poland she was a teacher in the underground education. She joined the Armia Krajowa resistance, took part in the Warsaw Uprising, and from 1944 until the end of the war she was a prisoner of war in Germany. During the war she wrote her first book for children, Historia o czterech pstroczkach.

After the war, Jurgielewiczowa settled in Warsaw. She lectured at the pedagogy department of the Warsaw University (1947–1950) and she was a literature director of the National Theatre of New Warsaw (Państwowy Teatr Nowej Warszawy). From 1954 she became a full-time writer. Her books were translated to numerous languages including Bulgarian, Czech, German, Italian, Japanese, Russian and Ukrainian.

Jurgielewiczowa was married to the painter Mieczysław Jurgielewicz. She died on 25 May 2003, aged 100 years.

Recognition 
Her work has been described as combining a knowledge of problems and mentality of her young readers with an interest in their ethical and intellectual transformation. Her readers have praised her for being "smart but not overbearing, patriotic but not nationalistic".

She wrote a number of children's literature and young adult literature as well as some mémoires. In 1958 she received the Award of the President of the Council of Minister for her work. A year later she received the Award of the City of Warsaw. She is best known for Ten obcy (That Stranger, 1961), for which she has received the International Board on Books for Young People diploma of honor in 1964. The book sequel, Inna? (Other?, 1975) was listed in the Premio Europeo. Her autobiography Byłam, byliśmy (I was, we were, 1998) was a finalist for the Nike Award. She is also a recipient of the Order of the Smile.

List of works 
Selected works of her include:
 1948: Historia o czterech pstroczkach
 1948: Warszawa-serce Polski
 1949: Literatura najłatwiejsza
 1950: Wiewiórcza mama
 1951: Osiem lalek i jeden miś (play)
 1954: KETSIS, Lubiński szczur
 1957: O chłopcu, który szukał domu
 1958: Kajtek, warszawski szpak
 1960: Jak jeden malarz chciał namalować szczęśliwego motyla
 1961: Ten obcy
 1963: Rozbita szyba (short story)
 1964: Niespokojne godziny
 1966: Tort orzechowy (short story)
 1968: Wszystko inaczej 
 1969: Niebezpieczna przygoda (short story)
 1971: Ważne i nieważne
 1975: Inna?
 1982: Strategia czekania (autobiography)
 1998: Byłam, byliśmy (autobiography)

References 

1903 births
2003 deaths
Home Army members
People from Pajęczno County
Polish centenarians
Polish children's writers
Polish schoolteachers
Warsaw Uprising insurgents
Writers of young adult literature
Polish women children's writers
Women writers of young adult literature
Women centenarians
20th-century Polish women
Women in World War II